Mount Gharat or Mount Garet (797 m), a somma volcano, is the highest peak on the volcanic island of Gaua of the Banks Islands in northern Vanuatu.

Geography
The peak is located at the centre of the island, is volcanically active and is surrounded by Lake Letas on all sides except southwest.

Name
The volcano has slightly different names, depending on which of the local languages is being considered. It is known as Garet  in Nume, Grāt  in Dorig, Gerät  in Koro, Gäräs  in Lakon. The spelling Gharat found sometimes on maps is an attempt at transcribing Mota Garat . 

All these names come from a Proto-Torres-Banks form *ɣarati, whose literal meaning is “itching, burning” ‒ perhaps in relation to the volcano's toxic fumes.

References 

Volcanoes of Vanuatu
Calderas of Oceania
Mountains of Vanuatu
Active volcanoes
Holocene stratovolcanoes